The 2019 European Parliament election in Italy were held on 26 May 2019, electing members of the 9th Italian delegation to the European Parliament as part of the European elections held across the European Union.

Electoral system 
The party-list proportional representation was the traditional electoral system of the Italian Republic from its establishment in 1946 to 1994, therefore it was also adopted to elect the Italian members of the European Parliament (MEPs) since 1979.

Two levels were introduced: a national level to divide the seats among parties and a constituency level to distribute them among candidates in open lists. Five constituencies were established, each including 2–5 regions and each electing a fixed number of MEPs. At national level, seats are divided between party lists using the largest remainder method with Hare quota. Seats are allocated to parties and then to their most voted candidates.

In the run-up to the 2009 European Parliament election, the Italian Parliament introduced a national threshold of 4%. An exception was granted for parties representing some linguistic minorities as such lists can be connected with one of the major parties, combining their votes, provided that those parties reach the 4% threshold and that candidates from minority parties obtain a sufficient number of votes, no less than 50,000 for the main candidate.

Background 
In 2014, the governing Democratic Party (PD) of Prime Minister Matteo Renzi won the election with 40.8% of the vote and 31 seats, followed by the Five Star Movement (M5S) with 21.2% and 17 seats and Forza Italia (FI) with 16.8% and 13 seats. As a result, the PD was the second largest national party in the European Parliament by number of seats after the German CDU/CSU and the largest among the Progressive Alliance of Socialists and Democrats (S&D). The PD's score was also the best result for an Italian party in a nationwide election since the 1958 general election, when the Christian Democracy (DC) won 42.4% of the vote.

However, after less than three years from the 2014 electoral landslide, Renzi was forced to resign after the defeat in the constitutional referendum and his foreign affairs minister Paolo Gentiloni was appointed new head of government in December 2016. Moreover, the 2018 general election was characterized by a strong showing of populist parties. The centre-right coalition, led by Matteo Salvini's right-wing League, emerged with a plurality of seats in the Chamber of Deputies and in the Senate while the anti-establishment M5S led by Luigi Di Maio became the party with the largest number of votes; and Renzi's centre-left came only third, with the worst electoral result of its history. However, no political group or party won an outright majority, resulting in a hung parliament. After three months of negotiation, a government was finally formed on 1 June by the M5S and the League, with the M5S-linked independent Giuseppe Conte as Prime Minister and Di Maio and Salvini Deputy Prime Ministers.

In March 2019, Nicola Zingaretti was elected secretary of the PD. In April, Zingaretti presented a special logo for the election, including a large reference to "We Are Europeans", a manifesto launched by Carlo Calenda; and the symbol of the Party of European Socialists (PES). Additionally, the PD is trying to forge an alliance with the Article One (Art.1) and minor parties. March and April registered more developments on the centre-left side of the political spectrum. Under the new leadership of Benedetto Della Vedova, More Europe (+E) formed a joint list with Italia in Comune (IiC), the Italian Socialist Party (PSI), the Italian Republican Party (PRI), the Italian section of the European Democratic Party (EDP), the Liberal Democratic Alliance for Italy (ALI) and minor parties; Italian Left (SI), the Communist Refoundation Party (PRC), minor parties and individual splinters from the disbanded Free and Equal (LeU) formed The Left (LS), a joint list inspired by the Party of the European Left (PEL); and the Federation of the Greens (FdV), Possible (Pos) and Green Italia (GI) formed Green Europe (EV) under the banner of the European Green Party (EGP). On the centre-right side, FI welcomed in its lists candidates of the Union of the Centre (UdC) and several alike minor parties while Brothers of Italy (FdI) formed a partnership with Direction Italy (DI) and minor groups.

Main parties and leaders

Outgoing MEPs 
The table shows the detailed composition of the Italian seats at the European Parliament before 26 May 2019.

Summary of parties 
This is a list of the main parties which participated in the election and were polled in most opinion surveys.

Top candidates 
In the following table, the top candidates of each party/list in the five constituencies are listed.

Slogans

Opinion polling 

Poll results are listed according to the date of publication of the survey. Detailed data are usually published in the official website of the Italian government. The publication of opinion polls during the last 15 days of the electoral campaign is forbidden by Italian law.

Polls after April 2019

Hypothetical polls until April 2019

Results

Detailed results
By constituency

By region

By municipality (with more than 100,000 inhabitants)

References 

Italy
European Parliament elections in Italy
2019 elections in Italy